Paul Swindlehurst (born 25 May 1993) is a retired British ice hockey player who last played for Elite Ice Hockey League side Coventry Blaze and the British national team.

He represented Great Britain at the 2019 IIHF World Championship and 2021 IIHF World Championship.

Swindlehurst retired from hockey in 2021 in order pursue a career with the police.

References

External links

1993 births
Living people
Belfast Giants players
British expatriate ice hockey people
English expatriate sportspeople in Australia
English expatriate sportspeople in Canada
Coventry Blaze players
Dundee Stars players
English ice hockey defencemen
Manchester Storm (2015–) players
Nottingham Panthers players
People from Blackrod
Swindon Wildcats players
Sydney Ice Dogs players
TH Unia Oświęcim players
English expatriate sportspeople in Poland
Expatriate ice hockey players in Canada
Expatriate ice hockey players in Australia
Expatriate ice hockey players in Poland
Sportspeople from Greater Manchester